Michael Jacobson (born April 4, 1997) is an American football tight end who is a free agent. He played college basketball for the Iowa State Cyclones and Nebraska Cornhuskers.

Early life and high school career
Jacobson attended Waukee High School. He averaged 17.1 points and 9.7 rebounds per game as a junior and earned second-team all-state recognition. On February 3, 2015, he posted 34 points and 9 rebounds in a 82–57 win against Mason City High School. As a senior, Jacobson averaged 18.6 points, 9.6 rebounds, 2.4 blocks per game, earning First-team All-CIML honors. He committed to Nebraska over offers from Harvard, Lehigh, UTEP, Indiana State and Drake. Jacobson received a scholarship offer to play football at Iowa State, but turned it down to focus on basketball.

College career
As a freshman at Nebraska, Jacobson made 25 starts, averaging 4.7 points and 4.3 rebounds per game on a team that finished 16–18. He started 31 games as a sophomore on a 12-19 team and averaged 6.0 points and 6.2 rebounds per game. Following the season, Jacobson was one of four players to transfer from the team and signed with Iowa State, a school he had grown up supporting. Per NCAA regulations, he sat out a redshirt season, and spent the year practicing against fellow transfer Marial Shayok. In the beginning of his junior season, coach Steve Prohm started Jacobson due to the suspension of Cameron Lard, and continued starting him when Lard returned due to Jacobson's strong play. On November 20, 2018, Jacobson scored a career-high 23 points in an 84–68 win against Illinois. He averaged 11.1 points and 5.9 rebounds per game as a junior, shooting 57.6 percent from the field, and helped the Cyclones reach the NCAA Tournament. Jacobson earned Big 12 All-Tournament team honors after averaging 9.7 points and 9.3 rebounds per game during the tournament, and was also named the 2019 Big 12 Men's Basketball Scholar-Athlete of the Year. As a senior, Jacobson averaged 7.8 points and 5.9 rebounds per game.

Professional career

Basketball
On August 17, 2020, Jacobson signed his first professional contract with Kyiv-Basket of the Ukrainian Basketball SuperLeague.

American football
On August 6, 2021, Jacobson signed with the Seattle Seahawks of the NFL. He was waived on August 10, 2021, and re-signed to the practice squad on September 15. He was released on September 25.

On October 5, 2021, Jacobson was signed to the Indianapolis Colts practice squad. He signed a reserve/future contract with the Colts on January 10, 2022.

On August 30, 2022, Jacobson was waived by the Colts.

Personal life
Jacobson is the son of Katie and Bill Jacobson. A grandfather played football and baseball at Iowa State. Bill Jacobson played basketball at Omaha in the 1980s and is currently an orthopedic surgeon.

References

External links
Nebraska Cornhuskers bio
Iowa State Cyclones bio

1997 births
Living people
American men's basketball players
American expatriate basketball people in Ukraine
Nebraska Cornhuskers men's basketball players
Iowa State Cyclones men's basketball players
Power forwards (basketball)
People from Waukee, Iowa
Basketball players from Iowa
Kyiv-Basket players
Seattle Seahawks players
Indianapolis Colts players
American football tight ends